Marcos Júnior Lima dos Santos (born 19 January 1993), known as Marcos Júnior, is a Brazilian professional footballer who plays as an attacking midfielder or a winger for Yokohama F. Marinos.

Club career 
Marcos Júnior started his youth career in Fluminese. He was promoted to the first team in 2012 and with 16 matches played in the league competition he was part of the Fluminese team that went on to win the Brazil Serie A trophy that year.

On 1 June 2014, Fluminense loaned Marcos Júnior out to EC Vitória until 31 December 2014. 

On 4 January 2019, Marcos Júnior signed with Yokohama F. Marinos in the J. League Division 1. On 23 February 2019, he made his debut against Gamba Osaka and on 10 March he scored his first goal for the club.

The 15 goals he scored in his first season in the J1 League was enough to crown him the highest goal-scorer in the league and was vital for Yokohama F. Marinos as they clinched the 2019 J1 League. He was also named in the J.League Best XI.

Career statistics

Honours
Fluminense
Campeonato Carioca: 2012
Campeonato Brasileiro Série A: 2012
Primeira Liga: 2016
Taça Guanabara: 2017
Taça Rio: 2018

Yokohama F. Marinos
J1 League: 2019, 2022

Individual
Campeonato Carioca Team of the year: 2018
J.League Top Scorer: 2019
J.League Best XI: 2019

References

External links

1993 births
Living people
Sportspeople from Federal District (Brazil)
Brazilian footballers
Association football forwards
Brazil youth international footballers
Campeonato Brasileiro Série A players
J1 League players
Fluminense FC players
Esporte Clube Vitória players
Yokohama F. Marinos players